Kaori Ishibashi (石橋かおりIshibashi Kaori; born May 6, 1962) is a Japanese confectionery researcher, baking instructor, and author known for her specialty in cheesecakes. She has written 48 baking cookbooks and over 400 cheesecake recipes.

Biography 
Kaori Ishibashi was born in Chiba, Japan and raised in Nagano where she graduated from Suwafutaba High School. She went on to attend Meiji University of Integrative Medicine and graduated as a practitioner in acupuncture and moxibustion. After graduating, she worked at Tokyo Jiyugaoka Hospital as a chiropractor and practitioner of moxibustion.

Career 
Ishibashi began her confectionery career as a self-taught baker starting off with wholesale business to local restaurants and taking request orders for wedding cakes while working as an acupuncturist in 1992. Fascinated by the art of baking, she began reading cookbook after cookbook wondering why her finished product never turned out as expected. Unsatisfied with the conventional methods found in the cookbooks she read she decided to learn under confectioner and former house of representatives member Makiko Fujino. After 3 years under the training of Fujino, she received a diploma from Makiko Foods Studio. Thereafter she attended various culinary schools around the world such as Bellouet Conseil in France, The Culinary Institute of America, Valrhona Chocolate School in France, and received training under various French chefs visiting Japan. In 1996 through collection of data from hundreds of baking experiments she was able to compile them into her first published book "絶対失敗しないシッフォンケーキ" (zettai shippai shinai shifon kēki). She also runs her own baking studio "Cake" (ケイク） in her newly renovated house in Nagano where she offers a year long class on the fundamentals of baking.

Current projects 
Ishibashi is currently living and working in Nagano, Japan as a confectionery researcher and author. She regularly publishes recipes in various magazines such as "レタスクラブ (retasukurabu), "Ｓａｉｔａ", "おはよう奥さん" (ohayō okusan), "天然生活" (tennen seikatsu). She is also president of Cake Freak Inc. Ishibashi is currently focusing her efforts on opening her own cheesecake shop in New York City.

Bibliography

References 

1962 births
Living people
Confectioners
Bakers
Japanese chefs
People from Chiba Prefecture